Bibiane Schulze Solano (born 12 November 1998) is a professional footballer who plays as a centre back for Spanish Liga F club Athletic Bilbao. Born and raised in Germany, she is of Basque heritage on her mother's side and was called up for the Spain national squad in 2023.

Club career
Schulze joined the youth system of 1.FFC Frankfurt from FV 08 Neuenhain and progressed through the ranks to play seven times in the Frauen-Bundesliga for the club. She departed for Athletic Bilbao in July 2019.

The move proved controversial, as some Athletic supporters questioned whether Schulze was Basque enough to conform to the club's signing policy. Club president Aitor Elizegi rejected the complaints, attesting to Schulze's "clear Basque origin" (in addition to the family typically spending summer holidays in the region, her great-grandfather Francisco Belauste played for the club in its early years).

Schulze was predominantly restricted to appearances for the Athletic Bilbao B team, although she made one Primera División appearance as a substitute against Sevilla in October 2020. In July 2021 Schulze signed a season-long loan deal with Athletic's Primera División rivals Valencia CF. With regular central defenders Garazi Murua and Naroa Uriarte absent through injury, Schulze became an important member of the Athletic side in the first half of the 2022–23 season.

International career
Overlooked for the Germany selection at the 2015 UEFA Women's Under-17 Championship in Iceland, Schulze made a late, unsuccessful approach through her Frankfurt team-mate Verónica Boquete to represent Spain at the event. Due to her form for Athletic, she was called up for the Spanish squad in February 2023 – but had to withdraw a day later due to injury.

References

External links
 
 Bibiane Schulze at La Liga
 Bibi at BDFutbol
 
 
 
 

1998 births
Living people
German women's footballers
Primera División (women) players
Women's association football defenders
People from Main-Taunus-Kreis
Sportspeople from Darmstadt (region)
Athletic Club Femenino players
German people of Basque descent
German expatriate women's footballers
Expatriate women's footballers in Spain
German expatriate sportspeople in Spain
Valencia CF Femenino players
1. FFC Frankfurt players
Segunda Federación (women) players
Athletic Club Femenino B players
German people of Spanish descent
Frauen-Bundesliga players
Footballers from Hesse